The  was the camp follower contingent of the Landsknecht mercenary regiments which originated at the end of the fifteenth century, and were the dominant form of infantry mercenary force throughout the sixteenth century. Each  unit traveled with a  contingent, which followed behind. They carried the military and fighting necessities, the food and the belongings of each "Soldat" ("soldier") and his family. The term "support staff" can be used to give the German word a clearer meaning, although its true English translation is "unit train" or "baggage train". Sometimes spelled Dross, the term derives from Middle High German trosse, from French trousse ("kit"); it is not related to English dross (Old English drōsna, drōsne, "dregs, sediment").

Some of the women were betrothed to a member of the military unit. However, they were closely watched until they took a legitimate husband.

During the Thirty Years' War, it could occur that a 1,000-man regiment would be accompanied by 500 women and 300 children. The  was indispensable for supply purposes, although it limited the freedom of movement of the army. At times, the  fell prey to opposing armies.

Notes
Portions of this article were translated from the German Wikipedia.

References

 Möller, Hans-Michael. Das Regiment der Landsknechte: Untersuchungen zu Verfassung, Recht und Selbstverständnis in Deutschen Söldnerheeren des 16. Jahrhunderts. Frankfurter Historische Abhandlungen (Steiner), 1976.

Landsknechts
German words and phrases